The 1923 Boston Braves season was the 53rd season of the franchise.

Offseason 
 October 15, 1922: Gus Felix was drafted by the Braves from the Shreveport Gassers (Texas) in the 1922 rule 5 draft.

Regular season 
 October 6, 1923: Ernie Padgett of the Braves executed an unassisted triple play. He caught a line drive, touched second base, and tagged the runner coming from first base. Padgett played just four games for the Braves all season, but would become the Braves' regular third baseman in 1924.

Season standings

Record vs. opponents

Roster

Player stats

Batting

Starters by position 
Note: Pos = Position; G = Games played; AB = At bats; H = Hits; Avg. = Batting average; HR = Home runs; RBI = Runs batted in

Other batters 
Note: G = Games played; AB = At bats; H = Hits; Avg. = Batting average; HR = Home runs; RBI = Runs batted in

Pitching

Starting pitchers 
Note: G = Games pitched; IP = Innings pitched; W = Wins; L = Losses; ERA = Earned run average; SO = Strikeouts

Other pitchers 
Note: G = Games pitched; IP = Innings pitched; W = Wins; L = Losses; ERA = Earned run average; SO = Strikeouts

References

External links
1923 Boston Braves season at Baseball Reference

Boston Braves seasons
Boston Braves
Boston Braves
1920s in Boston